Dubyonsky District (Tumobuje; , Dubönkań ajmak) is an administrative and municipal district (raion), one of the twenty-two in the Republic of Mordovia, Russia. It is located in the east of the republic. Its administrative center is the rural locality (a selo) of Dubyonki. As of the 2010 Census, the total population of the district was 13,851, with the population of Dubyonki accounting for 24.0 % of that number.

Administrative and municipal status
Within the framework of administrative divisions, Dubyonsky District is one of the twenty-two in the republic. The district is divided into sixteen selsoviets which comprise twenty-nine rural localities. As a municipal division, the district is incorporated as Dubyonsky Municipal District. Its sixteen selsoviets are incorporated into sixteen rural settlements within the municipal district. The selo of Dubyonki serves as the administrative center of both the administrative and municipal district.

References

Notes

Sources

Districts of Mordovia
 
